Broadmoor Hospital is a British high security psychiatric hospital.

Broadmoor may also refer to:

Places

United Kingdom
 Broadmoor, Pembrokeshire, Wales 
 Broad Moor, site of the Battle of Naseby, 1645

United States
 Broadmoor (Little Rock), Arkansas
 Broadmoor, California
 Broadmoor, Colorado
 Broadmoor, Illinois
 Broadmoor, Louisiana
 Broadmoor, New Orleans, Louisiana
 Broadmoor, Seattle, Washington

Other places
Broadmoor village, Sherwood Park, Alberta, Canada

Sports
 Broadmoor Golf Club, Colorado Springs, U.S.
 Broadmoor Golf Club, Seattle, U.S.
 Broadmoor Skating Club, Colorado Springs, U.S.
 Broadmoor Trophy, a Western Collegiate Hockey Association award

Other uses
 The Broadmoor, a hotel and resort in Colorado Springs, U.S.
 Broadmoor High School, in Baton Rouge, Louisiana, U.S.
 Broadmoor Records, a New Orleans-based record label
 Broadmoor station, a planned railway station in Austin, Texas, U.S.

See also